The Reunion Island day gecko (Phelsuma borbonica) is a species of gecko.  It is diurnal and lives in northern Réunion. It typically dwells on banana trees and feeds on insects and nectar.

Description 
This lizard belongs to the middle-sized  day geckos. It can reach a total length of about 16 cm. The colour can vary, depending on which population they belong to. The body colour is bluish green or dark green. The head has a yellowish colour, finely mottled with brown. On the back and tail there are brownish or red-brick coloured dots which form a network of reticulated bars. The red spots on the head and neck are smaller and denser than those on the back. The ventral surface is yellowish with brown marbling.

Distribution 
This species only inhabits northern part of Réunion. It was found at; Les Hauts du Brûlé,   Les Hauts Mensiol, Morne de Patates à Durand, near Bois de Nèfles, Belle-Vue, La Bretagne, Beaumont les Hauts, near St.Marie and Les Hauts de la Perrière near St. Suzanne.

Diet 
These day geckos feed on various insects and other invertebrates. They also like to lick soft, sweet fruit, pollen and nectar.

Care and maintenance in captivity 
These animals should be housed in pairs and need a large, well planted terrarium. The temperature should be between 25 and 28 °C. The humidity should be maintained between 75 and 100. In captivity, these animals can be fed with crickets, wax moths, fruit flies, mealworms and houseflies.

References 

Henkel, F.-W. and W. Schmidt (1995) Amphibien und Reptilien Madagaskars, der Maskarenen, Seychellen und Komoren. Ulmer Stuttgart. 
McKeown, Sean (1993) The general care and maintenance of day geckos. Advanced Vivarium Systems, Lakeside CA.

Endemic fauna of Réunion
Vertebrates of Réunion
Phelsuma
Reptiles described in 1982